The Museo MAGI ‘900 is a private museum in Pieve di Cento, Emilia-Romagna, Italy.

Description

History  
The Museo MAGI '900 was founded by an entrepreneur and contemporary art collector Giulio Bargellini, who in 2000 decided to open a space where he could share his passions with the general public.

The museum displays over 2,000 works of contemporary art distributed throughout 9,000 square meters and it is housed in a singular building – formerly a barn silo of the 1930s. Thanks to a project of the architect Giuseppe Davanzo, the silo was converted into a museum, to which two new exhibition spaces and a large garden dedicated to sculpture were added later on.

The Collection 
The vast and diverse collection takes visitors on a journey through Italian and international art of the last century. 

Bargellini's personal taste and connections with artists brought on the constitution of a wide permanent collection, which includes works from many movements; including the Belle Époque, sculptures by Giorgio de Chirico, the Maestri Storici del Novecento and hundreds of miniature paintings of the Collezione Minima 8x10 which once belonged to Cesare Zavattini. 

The Museo MAGI ‘900 hosts numerous well-known and historicized artists as well as less-known ones, in an exhibition space separated into thematic sections. 

Among the artists whose works appear in the museum are:

Services 
The permanent and the temporary collections can be visited by paying an entrance fee except for the OPEN BOX space, where there are always exhibitions and cultural events available for free. The museum organizes individual, thematic or personalized guided tours and offers laboratories for children as well as workshops for adults, which aim at making the participants understand art. 
The education department MAGICOMAGI offers a wide range of activities, from laboratories to animated visits for schools.

References

External links 
 Magi 900 Website

Organizations established in 2000
Modern art museums in Italy
Contemporary art galleries in Italy
Art museums established in 2000